Wolf Lake is a lake in Becker County, Minnesota, in the United States.

Wolf Lake was so named from the fact it was once a hunting ground of wolves and other animals.

See also
List of lakes in Minnesota

References

Lakes of Minnesota
Lakes of Becker County, Minnesota